Little Boy Lost is a dramatic novel by Marghanita Laski that was published in 1949. It was republished in 2001 by Persephone Books.

Plot
The novel focuses on Hilary Wainwright, an English man, on the search for his lost son in the ruins of post-war France.

Film, TV or theatrical adaptations
A motion picture version  of the same title starring Bing Crosby was released in 1953.

Reception
Kirkus Reviews found Little Boy Lost "An inescapably affecting story where sentiment is edged by bitterness." while Nicholas Lezard of the Guardian wrote "If you like a novel that expertly puts you through the wringer, this is the one." and "This is haunting stuff."

See also

References

External links
Little Boy Lost at Persephone Books

1949 British novels
British novels adapted into films
Cresset Press books